Keluang Man is a Malaysian comedy superhero who is based on the fruit bat. His costume and appearance is based on DC Comics' Batman. The Keluang Man cartoon series was very popular since his first appearance back in 1998 through Malaysian local TV channel, TV1 (Radio Televisyen Malaysia). However, production stopped for a while due to the economic crisis in 1997 and 1998, but later continued in 2000 until the series finally ended in 2005. In 2008, Keluang Man was re-aired on TV9.

A live-action film adaptation is announced to be in development.

Plot 
Set in Tampoi, Johor (near Johor Bahru), Keluang Man made his first appearance in an alley where a man is trying to rob a girl. Since then, Keluang Man has been media's most wanted. Keluang Man's real name is 'Borhan' and he is actually one of the mental patients in Tampoi Mental Hospital. The hospital security makes it hard for Keluang Man to act during daylight, so he decided only to fight for justice at night.

However, the existence of Keluang Man as a justice fighter did not make Inspector Shahab, the local police chief sit very well in his position. He sees Keluang Man as an annoying hero who always disturbs the police's business.

In the second episode of the first season, Tiong Man makes his first appearance in Keluang Man as a counterpart, holding a similar role as Robin in the Batman series. Both superheroes work together to fight supervillains such as Badut (The Clown), Mata Batu Johan Hitam, Samsir, Majid Kilat, Meow The Cat Girl and many more with the hope that the town of Tumpoi will turn back into a peaceful place for everyone.

Production 
Keluang Man was created by Kamn Ismail and his team of animators in June 1997 because former wanted the presence of "National Hero" at the moment. The pioneer team members were Kamn Ismail (Director), Wan Ayumi Wan Yusof (Asst. Production Director), Amir Hamzah Hashim (Chief Compositting Dept.) Mohd Azizi Amsam (Chief Animator), Raja Zaharuddin Shah (Chief Storyboards), Azhar Saad, Karim Wahab (Storyboard Artist), Razali Talib, Azman Ahad, Jamaluddin Shaadon (Compositt Artist) Arifin Sharif, Bibi, Norzana, Zawawi Zaid, Khairil Azwa, Asmawi, Hafidh Hassan, Shaharuddin Salleh (Animators) Anes Wardati, Asro (BG Artist) and Siti Zahrah Mat Zin (PA Cum Production Secretary). A few months later, the team was augmented by a group of new junior animators.

Trivia
Keluang (alternately Kluang) is also the name of a town in central Johor. It is 75 km northwest from Tampoi.

References

1998 Malaysian television series debuts
2005 Malaysian television series endings
1990s Malaysian television series
2000s Malaysian television series
Malaysian children's animated action television series
Malaysian children's animated adventure television series
Radio Televisyen Malaysia original programming